Cheng Jingqi is a Chinese table tennis player.

Formerly among the top junior players in the world, Cheng currently represents Bazhou Hairun in the China Table Tennis Super League.

References

Chinese male table tennis players
Year of birth missing (living people)
Place of birth missing (living people)
Living people
People from Qinhuangdao
Table tennis players from Hebei